A planing mill is a facility that takes cut and seasoned boards from a sawmill and turns them into finished dimensional lumber. Machines used in the mill include the planer and matcher, the molding machines, and varieties of saws. In the planing mill planer operators use machines that smooth and cut the wood for many different uses.

See also
Plane (tool)
Thickness planer

References

External links
Historic image of the Philomath, Oregon planing mill from the Oregon State University archives

Timber industry
Sawmill technology
Timber preparation
Industrial buildings